How's Your Mother-in-Law? was a comedy game show hosted by Wink Martindale that aired on ABC from December 4, 1967 to March 1, 1968.

The daytime series was produced and created by Chuck Barris during a period which, as he recounted in his autobiography Confessions of a Dangerous Mind, had him creating horrible formats due to the success of The Newlywed Game and The Dating Game (he also created The Family Game earlier in 1967).

Gameplay

Three mothers-in-law were represented by comedians acting as "defense attorneys". On the first week, the comedians were George Carlin, Richard Dawson, and Larry Storch; the show later included Nipsey Russell, Milt Kamen and Richard Dawson.

After each comedian presented his "case", a "jury" of five unmarried men and five unmarried women picked the mother-in-law they'd most like to have.  That mother-in-law received $100.  Each woman's son-in-law provided information (usually derogatory) to the comedians before the show.

Episode status
Four episodes are held at the UCLA Film and Television Archive – the Premiere, Episode #12 (December 19), and the show's two pilots (titled Here Come the Mothers-in-Law).

References

David Schwartz, Steve Ryan and Fred Wostbrock, "The Encyclopedia of TV Game Shows," second edition, 1995. 
Wesley Hyatt, "The Encyclopedia of Daytime Television."

External links
 

American Broadcasting Company original programming
1960s American comedy game shows
1967 American television series debuts
1968 American television series endings
Television series by Sony Pictures Television
Television series by Barris Industries
Television series created by Chuck Barris